Balbo's game is a chess variant invented by M. [Monsieur] G. Balbo in 1974. The chessboard has a novel shape comprising 70 squares, and each player commands a full chess army minus one pawn.

The game was featured in Le Courrier des Echecs magazine, September 1974.

Game rules
The starting setup is as shown. All the rules of chess apply, except there is no castling, and  promotion squares are specially defined:
 At the end of the d- through h-files, pawns have normal promotion options.
 At the end of the c- and i-files, pawns may promote only to a bishop or knight.
 At the end of the outer four files, pawns may not promote.

References

Bibliography

External links
 Balbo's chess by Hans Bodlaender, The Chess Variant Pages
 Balbo's Game a simple program by Ed Friedlander (Java)
 Green Chess

Chess variants
1974 in chess
Board games introduced in 1974